François Stahly (March 8, 1911 in Konstanz – July 2, 2006 in Paris) was a German-French sculptor.

Sources
 Works by Francois Stahly and Biographical info

External links
 

1911 births
2006 deaths
German sculptors
German male sculptors
20th-century French sculptors
French male sculptors
German emigrants to France